Jim Denney may refer to:

 Jim Denney (ski jumper born 1957), American former ski jumper
 Jim Denney (ski jumper born 1983), American ski jumper